Overhalla is a municipality in Trøndelag county, Norway. It is part of the Namdalen region. The administrative centre of the municipality is the village of Ranemsletta (also called Overhalla). Other villages include Melen, Skage, Skogmo, Svalia, and Øysletta.

The population is concentrated in the relatively broad Namsen river valley at the center. Public services, agriculture, and tourism are the main sources of income. Overhallahus (a house building company) and Pharmaq (a fish vaccine factory) are located in the municipality.

The  municipality is the 155th largest by area out of the 356 municipalities in Norway. Overhalla is the 207th most populous municipality in Norway with a population of 3,817.

General information

The municipality of Overhalla was established on 1 January 1838 (see formannskapsdistrikt law). During the 1960s, there were many municipal mergers across Norway due to the work of the Schei Committee, although Overhalla's borders were only slightly modified. On 1 January 1964, the Galguften and Hauknes area (population: 15) of Høylandet (on the southern shore of the lake Eidsvatnet) was transferred to Overhalla.  

On 1 January 2018, the municipality switched from the old Nord-Trøndelag county to the new Trøndelag county.

Name
The municipality (originally the parish) is named Overhalla which means "the upper half (of Namdalen)". Historically, the Namdalen district was divided in two parts: "the upper half" and "the lower half". The municipality of Overhalla today is, however, just a fraction of the old part of what was historically considered œfri hálfa. Historically, the name was spelled Overhallen.

Coat of arms
The coat of arms was granted on 2 June 1989. The official blazon is "Or, sevense crosses gules in annulo". This means the arms have a field (background) has a tincture of Or which means it is commonly colored yellow, but if it is made out of metal, then gold is used. The charge is a circular arrangement of seven greek crosses. The design was inspired by a 1344 seal used by local peasants on a document regarding the coronation of King Håkon Magnusson. The seal depicts a building topped with a cross similar to those on the coat of arms and at the local Ranem Church. The arms were designed by Harald Ekseth. The municipal flag has the same design as the coat of arms.

Geography

The municipality includes part of the lake Eidsvatnet, from which the river Bjøra flows into the river Namsen, which runs from the east to the west. By the time it reaches the border to Namsos, Namsen is already brackish and influenced by the tides the ocean. The river Nordelva also empties into the estuary here. On the south side of Namsen, there is an area of mountains, including Reinsjøfjell and mountain lakes; the Bangsjøene lakes form the border with Snåsa. The western approaches to Geitfjell lies in Overhalla, while the summit lies in Grong. The southern tip of the lake Storgrønningen lies in Overhalla, while the vast majority of the lake lies in Høylandet.

Government
All municipalities in Norway, including Overhalla, are responsible for primary education (through 10th grade), outpatient health services, senior citizen services, unemployment and other social services, zoning, economic development, and municipal roads. The municipality is governed by a municipal council of elected representatives, which in turn elect a mayor.  The municipality falls under the Trøndelag District Court and the Frostating Court of Appeal.

Municipal council
The municipal council of Overhalla is made up of 21 representatives that are elected to four year terms. The party breakdown of the council is as follows:

Mayors
The mayors of Overhalla:

1838–1841: Hans Tetlie 	
1842–1843: Andreas Samuelsen Vibstad 	
1844–1845: Halle E. Gansmo 	
1846–1849: Mathias A. Sellæg 	
1850-1851: Ove Christian Roll 	
1851–1853: Mathias A. Sellæg 	
1854–1855: Johan A. Sellæg 	
1856–1859: J.G. Steen 	
1860–1861: Halle E. Tetlie 	
1862–1869: Andreas Erlandsen 	
1870–1871: Johannes F. Barlien 	
1872–1877: Peter N. Solum 	
1878–1887: Svein G. Tetlie (V)
1888-1889: Ole M. Weglo (V)
1889–1891: Vilhelm Andreas Wexelsen (V)
1892–1910: Ole M. Weglo (V)
1911–1919: Peter S. Raabakken (V)
1920–1922: Esten Saugen (Bp)
1923–1928: Lorents Nagelhus (Bp)
1929–1931: Esten Saugen (Bp)
1932–1934: Lorents Nagelhus (Bp)
1935–1940: Olav Flotten (Bp)
1941–1942: Magnus Øyesvold (NS)
1942–1945: Aage Hagerup (NS)
1945-1945: Olav Flotten (Bp)
1946–1951: Agnar Grande (Bp)
1952–1955: Inge Himo (Bp)
1956–1960: Agnar Grande (Bp)
1960–1961: Inge Himo (Sp)
1962–1963: Sigmund Flasnes (Sp)
1964–1970: Kristian Hildrum (Sp)
1970–1975: Jostein O. Mørkved (V)
1976–1979: Sigmund Flasnes (Sp)
1980–1981: Jørund Øvereng (Sp)
1982–1999: Jørgen Tømmerås (Sp)
1999–2003: Frank Jensen (Ap)
2003-2003: Susanne Bratli (Ap)
2003–2011: Jostein Hildrum (Sp)
2011–2021: Per Olav Tyldum (Sp)
2021–present: Hege Kristin Kværnø Saugen (Sp)

Transportation
The historic Namsos Line railway traversed the municipality on its way from Grong to Namsos, but the line was closed to passenger traffic in 1978. Freight traffic on the line was discontinued in 2002. The Norwegian County Road 17 also crosses the municipality.

Culture
There are 38 grave mounds in the Hunn area. The Olamo-haugen is the largest of those. The other ones have been dated to years 600 to 800 Common Era, just before the Viking Age. During the construction of a school in Hunn, the Olamo-haugen mound was uncovered and studied. About  or about one-third of the mound was excavated by the time the dig was concluded (in 2022).

Churches
The Church of Norway has two parishes within the municipality of Overhalla. It is part of the Namdal prosti (deanery) in the Diocese of Nidaros.

Notable people

Public service 
 Jacob Hersleb Darre (1757 in Overhalla – 1841), a Norwegian vicar, rep. on the Norwegian Constitutional Assembly
 Hans Barlien (1772 in Overhalla – 1842), a farmer and politician, established the Norwegian-American immigrant settlement in Sugar Creek, Iowa
 Christian Møinichen Havig (1825 in Overhalla – 1912), a bailiff and politician
 Kristen Gran Gleditsch (1867 in Overhalla - 1946), a Norwegian military officer and topographer
 Alf Hildrum (born 1948 in Overhalla), a Norwegian media executive and politician
 Inge Ryan (born 1956 in Overhalla), a Norwegian politician, Mayor of Namsskogan 1991–1995, County Governor of Nord-Trøndelag, 2009-2017
 Susanne Bratli (born 1966 in Overhalla), a Norwegian politician, Mayor of Overhalla in 2003
 Trine Skei Grande (born 1969 in Overhalla), a politician and former leader of the Liberal Party of Norway

The Arts 
 Kristian Elster (1841 in Overhalla – 1881), a novelist, journalist, literary critic, theatre critic & forester
 Per Kvist (1890 in Overhalla – 1947), a revue writer, entertainer, stage & film actor 
 Johannes Rian (1891 in Overhalla – 1981), a Norwegian painter
 Bjarne Brøndbo (born 1964) and Eskil Brøndbo (born 1970), two rock musicians from Namsos

Sport 
 Gunhild Følstad (born 1981 in Overhalla), an international women's footballer

References

External links

Municipal fact sheet from Statistics Norway 

 
Municipalities of Trøndelag
1838 establishments in Norway